The  following is a list of awards and nominations received by Scottish actor David Tennant.

Major Associations

BAFTA Awards

Emmy Awards

Laurence Olivier Awards

Festivals

Edinburgh International Television Festival

Monte-Carlo Television Festival

Newport Beach Film Festival

New York Festivals

Rose d'Or

Shanghai International TV Festival

Other Awards

Audio Awards

BBC Audio Drama Awards

Television Awards

Broadcasting Press Guild Awards

Constellation Awards

Glenfiddich Spirit of Scotland Awards

National Television Awards

People's Choice Awards

Royal Television Society Programme Awards

Satellite Awards

Saturn Awards

Scream Awards

SFX Awards

TV Quick and TV Choice Awards

Theatre Awards

BroadwayWorld UK Awards

Critics' Awards for Theatre in Scotland

Critics' Circle Theatre Awards

Evening Standard Theatre Awards

Ian Charleson Awards

Manchester Evening News Theatre Awards

Theatregoers' Choice Awards

Theatre Management Association

WhatsOnStage Awards

References

Tennant, David